Brockis striatus, the Green blenny, is a species of labrisomid blenny native to the Pacific coast of Mexico where it is found in shallow waters with a rocky substrate and substantial weed growth.  This species can reach a length of  TL.

References

striatus
Fish of Mexican Pacific coast
Fish described in 1953
Taxa named by Clark Hubbs